Dammannapalli is a village in the Kadapa district of Andhra Pradesh, India  from Porumamilla.  It is part of the Badvel Assembly constituency and the Kadapa Parliamentary constituency.

History
During the Rampa Rebellion of 1922, Alluri Sitarama Raju killed several British police officers in the area around Dammannapalli.

References

Villages in Kadapa district